The men's tournament at the 2021 World Team Ninepin Bowling Classic Championships was held in Tarnowo Podgórne, Poland, from 23 to 30 October 2021.

Serbia defended and captured their sixth title by defeating Germans 5-3 in the final match. Bronze was secured by Croatia who beat Austria 6–2.

Participating teams 

14 associations applied to participate in the men's teams competition.

Draw 

Groups were drawn on August 27, 2021 during the technical briefing in Kranj.

Groups

Group stage

Group A 

|}

Group B 

|}

Group C 

|}

Group D 

|}

Final Round

Bracket

Quarterfinals

Semifinals

Third place game

Final

Final standing

References 

2021
2021 World Team Ninepin Bowling Classic Championships